Galloway-Walker House is a historic home located at Newport, New Castle County, Delaware.  The original section was built 18th century, and is a -story, three bay, brick dwelling with a gambrel roof.  The house was expanded with a frame addition to add a fourth bay in the late-19th century.  It is a hall-parlor plan dwelling.

It was added to the National Register of Historic Places in 1993.

References

External links

Houses on the National Register of Historic Places in Delaware
Houses in New Castle County, Delaware
Historic American Buildings Survey in Delaware
National Register of Historic Places in New Castle County, Delaware